Hadzhi Dimitar is the eastern terminus on the M3 line of the Sofia Metro. It was opened on 26 August 2020 as part of the inaugural section of the line, from Hadzhi Dimitar to Krasno Selo. The adjacent station is Teatralna.

Location
The station is located under the southern roadway on Vladimir Vazov Blvd. next to the residential district of the same name. It has a central lobby and has entrances to the south and north sidewalks of Vladimir Vazov Blvd. The southern entrance touches the main structure of the station. A curious detail of this station is that the northern entrance is reached by a pedestrian underpass passing under the Perlovska River (as at the Orlov Most and Teatralna stations) and the northern roadway of the boulevard. The station has side platforms. They are 105 m long and 4.5 m wide.

Architecture

The architect is Konstantin Kosev. The architectural layout of the station includes two levels. On one is located the entrance hall and its cash hall, connected to the entrances of the station, located in the sidewalks on both sides of Vladimir Vazov Blvd. The connection of the vestibule level with the two side platforms on the platform level is made by two stairs, one escalator and one elevator on each platform. There are also elevators to the entrances to connect the vestibule level with the surface. In this way, the station has 100% accessibility at all entrances and levels for disadvantaged people.

The proximity of the Perlovska River turns the station mostly blue. The architectural layout is solved by flooring of reinforced beige granite, the walls are lined with light beige and light blue granite, made in the form of inclined figures, framed by wide joints of etalbond.

References

Sofia Metro stations
2020 establishments in Bulgaria
Railway stations opened in 2020